Fierljeppen (West-Frisian compound of fier—"far" and ljeppen—"leaping") or polsstokverspringen is a traditional sport of the West Frisian people  in the Dutch province of Fryslân. The sport is nowadays also popular in the province of Utrecht which produced record holder Jaco de Groot.

Description
The sport involves a long pole and a body of water.

A jump consists of a sprint to the pole (polsstok), jumping and grabbing it, then climbing to the top of the pole while trying to control its forward and lateral movements over a body of water, and finishing by landing on a sand bed opposite to the starting point.

History
The Netherlands has many waterways. Fierljeppen originated as a way for Frisian people to get around the waterways easily. Over time it turned into a competition with the first official match in 1771 but the sport was not properly structured until 1957.
The sport is believed to have originated with farmers who used poles to leap over small water drainage channels to access different plots of land. In the German region of East Frisia this sport is known as Pultstockspringen.  Today the sport is primarily practiced for fun or to entertain tourists, but there still is an official annual National Fierljepping Manifestation (NFM) in the Netherlands, and championships are contested in six leagues and numerous clubs.

Record holders
The current Dutch record holders by category are:
Seniors: , Jaco de Groot from Woerden, Utrecht (12 August 2017, Zegveld)
Veterans: , Theo van Kooten from Haastrecht, South Holland (31 July 2013, Linschoten)
Ladies:  Marrit van der Wal from It Heidenskip, Friesland (31 July 2019, Burgum)
Juniors (under 20): , Reinier Overbeek from Benschop, Utrecht (19 August 2019, Burgum)
Boys (under 16): , Wisse Broekstra from Winsum, Friesland (19 September 2020, Burgum)
Girls (under 16): , Hanneke Westert from IJlst, Friesland (24 August 2022, Burgum)

There are 532 registered active jumpers in the world; of those, 190 are from the Netherlands.

Fierljeppen throughout the world
International tourists who have visited Friesland and who have observed this sport have helped to spread its popularity across the globe.  Competitions in other locales now take place, albeit at a less competitive level due to smaller numbers of athletes and the lack of suitable locations.

Many Americans were first introduced to the sport, referred to as "ditch-vaulting", on the twelfth season of The Amazing Race. This same task would be performed in the twenty-first and thirty-first seasons as a "Switchback" task.

See also
 Pole vault
 Shepherd's leap

References

External links

 PBholland.com

Sports originating in the Netherlands
Sport in Friesland
Dutch inventions
Traditional sports
Dutch folk culture
Frisian culture